Live Bootleg may refer to:
Live Bootleg (Audio Adrenaline album)
Live Bootleg (Hundred Reasons album)
Live Bootleg (Mudvayne album)
Live Bootleg (Resurrection Band album)
Live! Bootleg, an album by Aerosmith
Live Bootleg!, an album by the 2 Skinnee J's
Live Bootleg '82, an album by Daniel Amos

See also
Bootleg (disambiguation)